Horné Otrokovce is a village and municipality in Hlohovec District in the Trnava Region of western Slovakia.

History
In historical records the village was first mentioned in 1113.

Geography
The municipality lies at an altitude of 230 metres and covers an area of 9.059 km2. It has a population of about 897 people.

Genealogical resources

The records for genealogical research are available at the state archive "Statny Archiv in Bratislava, Nitra, Slovakia"

 Roman Catholic church records (births/marriages/deaths): 1719-1902 (parish A)
 Lutheran church records (births/marriages/deaths): 1783-1919 (parish B)

See also
 List of municipalities and towns in Slovakia

References

External links
https://web.archive.org/web/20070513023228/http://www.statistics.sk/mosmis/eng/run.html
Surnames of living people in Horne Otrokovce

Villages and municipalities in Hlohovec District